Arat Bon (also Romanized as Arāt Bon; also known as Arātahban and Kamand) is a village in Valupey Rural District, in the Central District of Savadkuh County, Mazandaran Province, Iran. At the 2006 census, its population was 253, in 84 families.

References 

Populated places in Savadkuh County